The 2013–14 daytime network television schedule for four of the five major English-language commercial broadcast networks in the United States covers the weekday daytime hours from September 2013 to August 2014. The schedule is followed by a list per network of returning series, and any series canceled after the 2012–13 season.

Affiliates fill time periods not occupied by network programs with local or syndicated programming. PBS – which offers daytime programming through a children's program block, PBS Kids – is not included, as its member television stations have local flexibility over most of their schedules and broadcast times for network shows may vary. Also not included are stations affiliated with Fox (as the network does not air a daytime network schedule or network news), MyNetworkTV (as the programming service also does not offer daytime programs of any kind), and Ion Television (as its schedule is composed mainly of syndicated reruns).

Legend

Schedule
 New series are highlighted in bold.
 All times correspond to U.S. Eastern and Pacific Time scheduling (except for some live sports or events). Except where affiliates slot certain programs outside their network-dictated timeslots, subtract one hour for Central, Mountain, Alaska, and Hawaii-Aleutian times.
 Local schedules may differ, as affiliates have the option to pre-empt or delay network programs. Such scheduling may be limited to preemptions caused by local or national breaking news or weather coverage (which may force stations to tape delay certain programs in overnight timeslots or defer them to a co-operated station or digital subchannel in their regular timeslot) and any major sports events scheduled to air in a weekday timeslot (mainly during major holidays). Stations may air shows at other times at their preference.

Monday-Friday

Saturday

Sunday

By network

ABC

Returning series:
ABC World News
The Chew
General Hospital
Good Morning America
The View
This Week with George Stephanopoluos
Litton's Weekend Adventure
Jack Hanna's Wild Countdown
Ocean Mysteries with Jeff Corwin
Born to Explore with Richard Wiese
Sea Rescue

New series:
Litton's Weekend Adventure
The Wildlife Docs
Expedition Wild

Not returning from 2012-13
Litton's Weekend Adventure
Recipe Rehab (moved to CBS)
Food for Thought with Claire Thomas

CBS

Returning series:
The Bold and the Beautiful
CBS Evening News
CBS News Sunday Morning
CBS This Morning
Face the Nation
Let's Make a Deal
The Price is Right
The Talk
The Young and the Restless

New series:
CBS Dream Team
Lucky Dog
Dr. Chris Pet Vet
Recipe Rehab (moved from ABC)
Jamie's 15-Minute Meals
All In with Laila Ali
Game Changers with Kevin Frazier

Not returning from 2012-13
Cookie Jar TV
Busytown Mysteries
The Doodlebops
Liberty’s Kids

The CW

Returning series:
The Bill Cunningham Show
The Adventures of Chuck and Friends
Rescue Heroes
Sonic X 
Bolts and Blip
The Spectacular Spider-Man
Justice League Unlimited
Dragon Ball Z Kai
B-Daman Crossfire
Yu-Gi-Oh!
Yu-Gi-Oh! Zexal
Cubix: Robots for Everyone

New series:
Digimon Fusion

Not returning from 2012-13
Power Rangers Lost Galaxy
Iron Man: Armored Adventures
WWE Saturday Morning Slam
Transformers Prime (continues on The Hub)
The New Adventures of Nanoboy

FOX

Returning series:
Fox News Sunday
Fox Sports
Fox NFL
Fox NFL Sunday
Weekend Marketplace

Not returning from 2012-13:
MLB Player Poll

NBC

Returning series:
Days of Our Lives
Meet the Press
NBC Nightly News
Today
NBC Kids
The Chica Show
Pajanimals
Justin Time
Tree Fu Tom
LazyTown
Noodle and Doodle

New series:
NBC Kids
Make Way for Noddy
Zou

Not returning from 2012-13
NBC Kids
Poppy Cat
The Wiggles (continues on Sprout)

See also
2013–14 United States network television schedule (prime-time)
2013–14 United States network television schedule (late night)

References

Sources
 
 
 

United States weekday network television schedules
2013 in American television
2014 in American television